The Newcastle Scholarship is an annual prize awarded at Eton College in England for the highest performance in a series of special written examinations taken over the course of a week. It was instituted and first awarded in 1829 and is the college's most prestigious prize. Originally focused on both Divinity and Classics (which is now examined separately), the main prize now covers philosophical theology, moral theory, and applied ethics.

History
The scholarship was instituted and first awarded in 1829 on the initiative and benefaction of Henry Pelham-Clinton, 4th Duke of Newcastle. The Statutes, recorded in 1841, state:

'The design and object of these Scholarships is to promote and encourage a Religious education and sound and useful Learning in general among the Scholars of Eton School, including particularly accurate Scholarship in Greek and Roman literature but most especially and principally to inculcate a thorough knowledge of the Evidence, Doctrines and Precepts of the Christian Religion.'

The winner of the Newcastle Scholarship was awarded a cash prize of £250, a considerable sum in 1829, while the runner-up received a gold medal. Originally a series of up to twelve examinations in the ancient languages and in knowledge of Biblical texts, the Scholarship was split into two in 1977, becoming one Prize for Divinity and one for Classics.

Exam format
Since 1987 the Newcastle Scholarship has been an examination in philosophical theology, moral theory, and applied ethics. Candidates sit two three-hour papers after Long Leave (the mid-term break) in the Lent Half (the winter term). Each paper consists of about 12 questions divided into two sections. Candidates must answer three questions in each paper, at least one chosen from each section.

Since its foundation, many distinguished British theologians and philosophers have been invited to examine the Newcastle. In 1840 William Gladstone was one of the examiners, together with Lord Lyttelton.  In addition to setting the papers and marking the scripts, they choose a set book on a theme of their choice, upon which candidates are examined.

Winners
Distinguished winners of the Newcastle Scholarship have included Sir Edward Shepherd Creasy (1831), William Johnson Cory (1841), WR Inge (1879), M. R. James (1882), Patrick Shaw-Stewart (1905), Arthur Rhys-Davids (1916), Quintin Hogg, Baron Hailsham of St Marylebone (1925), Douglas Hurd (1947), William Waldegrave (1965, currently Provost of Eton College) and Kwasi Kwarteng (1992). Those who have become professional classicists include Roger Mynors (1922), Charles Willink (1946), Adrian Hollis (1958), Richard Jenkyns (1966) and Armand D’Angour (1976).

The following is a list of winning Scholars, and Medallists (runners-up) since 1946. They are listed with their post-nominals earned at the school: "KS": King's Scholar; "OS": Oppidan Scholar; "MS": Music Scholar; "ME": Music Exhibitioner.

"ma" indicates the elder of two brothers at the school, or exceptionally the eldest of three or the second of four or more; "mi" similarly indicates the second of two or three, or the third of four or more.

Recent Examiners

References

Eton College